Charles Eschard (1748 - 1810) was a French painter, draftsman and engraver.

Eschard began his art training at the Rouen Academy of Arts directed by Jean-Baptiste Descamps. He then went to spend a few years in Holland, where he studied the masterpieces of Flemish masters.

Back in France, he exhibited at The Louvre View of Marseille: Joust and party on the water, and A view of the port of Harlem. In 1798 he again exhibited A view of Mont Blanc and A view of Holland around Groningen. Another picture of the same kind, A view of the channel extending around Holland, was given by the author to the Museum of Rouen. It was approved by the Royal Academy of Painting and Sculpture in 1783.

Charles Eschard, who according to some experts used soft brushstrokes and pleasant colors, also engraved etchings of a number of highly sought after subjects. His key prints were The Shepherds, The Beggars, and The Fisherman.

References 
 Théodore-Éloi Lebreton, Biographie rouennaise, Rouen, Le Brument, 1865
 Françoise Debaisieux Charles Eschard, Caen v. 1748 -? v. 1815 designer painter and engraver: Museum of Fine Arts in Caen, August 1 - October 25, 1984, Museum of Fine Arts, Caen, 1984

18th-century French painters
French male painters
19th-century French painters
French draughtsmen
French engravers
1748 births
1810 deaths
Artists from Caen
19th-century French male artists
18th-century French male artists